Two icebreakers and one class of icebreaker, have been named Taymyr, after the Taymyr Peninsula:

 , a steam-powered icebreaker
 
 , a nuclear-powered shallow draft icebreaker

See also
 Taymyr (disambiguation)

Ship names